Anna Pasternak (born June 1967) is a British author of books, articles, and spa reviews.

Early life 
Pasternak was born in 1967.  She is the great-granddaughter of Leonid Pasternak, the impressionist painter, and the great-niece of Nobel Prize-winning novelist Boris Pasternak, author of Doctor Zhivago. Her father is the scientist Charles Pasternak and her first cousin once removed is the literary scholar Ann Pasternak Slater (niece of Boris Pasternak).

Career

Pasternak's book Princess In Love (1994) claimed to detail the affair of Princess Diana with James Hewitt. According to The Independent, "The work has been widely panned for its breathless Mills and Boon style." The Los Angeles Times said it "has few quotations and is written in the breathless style of romantic fiction, containing the supposed thoughts and feelings of Princess Diana" and Buckingham Palace called it "grubby and worthless." Despite the book's condemnation, Diana later confirmed the affair.

Her 1998 novel, More Than Money Can Buy is about a man with "aspirations for money, power and rich women" working in the international shipping arena.

Beginning in 2004, Pasternak published a relationship column titled Daisy Dooley. And in 2007, she published a novel titled Daisy Dooley Does Divorce. Described as being about a "self-help junkie [who] comes to terms with divorce," it features chapters titled "Dick Delivery Boys," "The Sperminator," and "Premature We-Jacualtion." Kirkus Reviews said it is "worth wading through," though Publishers Weekly called it a "frustrating traipse through divorcedom," concluding that "the reading experience is less than exhilarating."

In 2013, under the name Anna Wallas, Pasternak published a self-help book with her husband titled Call Off The Search.

In 2016, Pasternak published a biography of Boris Pasternak and his mistress, Olga Ivinskaya, titled Lara: The Untold Love Story That Inspired Doctor Zhivago. The book received mixed reviews. NPR said it serves as an "upsetting reminder of what can happen when free speech is curtailed." While The New York Times said that "the 'untold' in the subtitle simply isn't true" because "the story of Pasternak's affair with Olga has been told repeatedly — for instance, in Olga's own memoirs." It concluded: "In 'Lara,' Anna Pasternak treats 'Doctor Zhivago' as a romance, more or less interchangeable with the hit movie, and she displays minimal understanding of Pasternak's literary achievement."

In 2019, Pasternak issued legal proceedings against American author Lara Prescott, claiming that Prescott's novel The Secrets We Kept features "an astonishing number of substantial elements" taken from Lara. Pasternak lost the lawsuit, with the judge ruling that "It is clear that the defendant did not copy from Lara the selection of events in the relevant chapters of The Secrets We Kept or any part of that selection." Pasternak was ordered to pay back 99% of Prescott's costs, totaling 1 million Sterling Pounds.

In the same year, Pasternak published a book about Wallis Simpson's affair with Edward VIII, titled The American Duchess, the Real Wallis Simpson. Kirkus Reviews wrote that "Pasternak offers a variety of thought-provoking arguments" while The Telegraph said, "This Mills & Boon-ish mess might be the worst biography of Wallis Simpson ever written."

In May 2020, Pasternak published an article in The Tatler about Princess Catherine. Kensington Palace threatened legal action, saying that the story "contains a swathe of inaccuracies and false misrepresentations which were not put to Kensington Palace prior to publication." The Tatler eventually removed a paragraph from the article.

Her writing has been called "Mills & Boon," referring to the publisher of romance novels, and has often centered on detailing the extramarital affairs of real married women. Pasternak is also an active writer of spa and hotel reviews.

Film and television commentary

Pasternak has also appeared on numerous news programmes and documentaries, sometimes courting controversy with her comments.

In 2021, whilst being interviewed for BBC Breakfast, Pasternak said that, "anyone like me who is white, privileged and well-educated is not able to say anything without it being viewed as racist" and "we as a white minority nowadays are silenced from being able to speak our truth."The comments sparked an online backlash. But BBC defended Pasternak following a barrage of complaints about the interview.

Later in the same year, Pasternak appeared in a three-hour Sky Documentaries series about former Jeffrey Epstein associate Ghislaine Maxwell, whom Pasternak reportedly knew during their university years. In covering the series, The Guardian criticized Pasternak, referring to her as the "waffler-in-chief" and calling her commentary on Maxwell, a convicted sex offender and human trafficker, "unsearing."

Personal life

Anna Pasternak is married to her former therapist, Andrew Wallas, a psychotherapist and entrepreneur who calls himself "The Modern-Day Wizard." He has taught "spiritual psychology, intuitive healing and body whispering." They met in a yurt.

In 2018, her stepdaughter with Wallas gained notoriety when she went missing in the Brazilian rainforest after wandering in barefoot to meditate. Pasternak has a daughter named Daisy Pasternak.

References 

British writers
1967 births
Living people